Sycamore Stadium is a baseball stadium in Terre Haute, Indiana, United States.  The venue is used by both the Indiana State Sycamores baseball team of the Missouri Valley Conference and the Terre Haute Rex of the college summer Prospect League.  It has a capacity of 2,500 spectators.

To date, it has hosted three Missouri Valley Conference Baseball Championships, 1982, 2014 and 2016.  It regularly serves as a venue for IHSAA and American Legion Baseball tournaments.

Field 
Since moving into Sycamore Field in 1978, Indiana State University has played over 850 baseball games at home and posted an outstanding record of 586–268–1 (.686).  At the conclusion of the 2009 season, Sycamore Field was completely renovated and renamed Bob Warn Field at Sycamore Stadium in honor of Indiana State University's coach, Bob Warn.

The field is also distinguishable, as it has an infield which is completely artificial turf and an outfield of natural grass.

Facility 
The stadium features:
 2,500 seats
 389 chairback seats centered among the bleacher seats
 1,910 bleacher seats
 Locker rooms for the home and visiting teams
 A climate-controlled press box
 Offices for the head coach and assistants
 An indoor hitting facility
 Stadium lighting
 Infield turf and grass outfield

See also 
 List of NCAA Division I baseball venues

References

External links 
Indiana Baseball Hall of Fame Inductees: Bob Warn, Coach.
Coming 2010: Bob Warn Field at Sycamore Stadium.
Indiana Statesman: Former coach breaks ground on new baseball stadium.
Indiana State University: Sycamore Field.

Baseball venues in Indiana
College baseball venues in the United States
Indiana State Sycamores baseball
Buildings and structures in Terre Haute, Indiana
Tourist attractions in Terre Haute, Indiana
1978 establishments in Indiana
Sports venues completed in 1978